The Age of Innocence is a 1934 American drama film directed by Philip Moeller and starring Irene Dunne, John Boles and Lionel Atwill. The film is an adaptation of the 1920 novel The Age of Innocence by Edith Wharton, set in the fashionable New York society of the 1870s. Prolific on Broadway, Philip Moeller directed only two films:  this, and the 1935 Break of Hearts with Katharine Hepburn.

The novel was also adapted in a 1924 silent film version starring Beverly Bayne and a 1993 film version that starred Michelle Pfeiffer. A 1928 Broadway stage adaptation starred Katharine Cornell.

Premise
At his 1875 engagement party, the wealthy Newland Archer (John Boles) is surprised to meet his childhood friend Ellen (Irene Dunne), beautiful and grown up and now Countess Olenska.  Olenska is the cousin of his fiancee May (Julie Haydon) and is considered scandalous by the strait-laced society of the time.  Newland, however, treats her well and sends her two dozen yellow roses. Olenska turns to Newland for advice about a possible divorce.

Cast

 Irene Dunne as Countess Ellen Olenska
 John Boles as Newland Archer
 Lionel Atwill as Julius Beaufort
 Helen Westley as Granny Manson Mingott
 Laura Hope Crews as Augusta Welland
 Julie Haydon as May Welland
 Herbert Yost as Howard Welland
 Teresa Maxwell-Conover as Mrs. Archer
 Edith Van Cleve as Jane Archer
 Leonard Carey as Jasper, the Butler
 Harry Beresford as Museum Guard (uncredited)
 Herbert Bunston as W.J. Letterblair (uncredited)

Reception
The film was a box-office disappointment.

References

External links
 
 
 
 
 

1934 films
1930s historical drama films
American historical drama films
American black-and-white films
1930s English-language films
Films scored by Max Steiner
Films based on American novels
Films based on works by Edith Wharton
Films set in the 1870s
Films set in New York City
Remakes of American films
Sound film remakes of silent films
RKO Pictures films
1934 drama films
1930s American films